Spangle is a historical novel written by Gary Jennings and first published in 1987.

Plot introduction
After surrendering at Appomattox Court House in Virginia at the end of the American Civil War, two Confederate soldiers wander off and join Florian’s Flourishing Florilegium of Wonders, a traveling circus that has managed to continue performing throughout the war.  Escaping from the coming Reconstruction of the South, the circus embarks for Europe where they meet many adventures as they travel throughout Europe between 1865 and 1871.

Plot summary
Spangle is a historical novel written by Gary Jennings (1928–1999). Published in 1987, it follows a circus troupe known as "Florian's Flourishing Florilegium of Wonders" from the Confederate surrender at Appomattox to Europe, ending in France during the Franco-Prussian War. The book chronicles the rise of the troupe from a small "mud show" with few acts to the glittering toast of Paris, while delving into the evolving personal lives of its performers. The book is also an examination of the social structures of both post-Civil War America and Europe during a period in which the ancient system of monarchy was toppling. The main protagonist, other than the circus itself, is Zachary Edge, a former Confederate colonel embittered by war who accepts a position as the Florilegium's equestrian director. Edge's trials, both professional and personal, form the core of the plot, which details Edge's rise in the ranks of the circus in parallel to the rise of the Florilegium.

Important Characters

Artistes

Notable Crew Members

Menagerie

Release details
 1987, USA, Atheneum Books
Also released as a trilogy mass market paperback:
 1999, USA, Forge Books The Road Show: Spangle #1
 1999, USA, Forge Books The Center Ring: Spangle #2
 1999, USA, Forge Books The Grand Promenade: Spangle #3

See also

historical fiction
List of historical novelists
List of historical novels

1987 American novels
American historical novels
Novels set in the 19th century
Cultural depictions of Empress Elisabeth of Austria
Atheneum Books books